Havinck  is a 1987 Dutch drama film directed by Frans Weisz. It was screened in the Un Certain Regard section the 1988 Cannes Film Festival.

Cast
 Willem Nijholt - Lawyer Havinck
 Will van Kralingen - Havinck's wife Lydia
 Carolien van den Berg - Havinck's mistress Maud
 Anne Martien Lousberg - Havinck's daughter Eva
 Maarten Wansink - Greve
 Coen Flink - Bork
 Max Croiset - Havinck's father-in-law
 Dora van der Groen - Havinck's mother-in-law
 Kenneth Herdigein - Kenneth
 Eric van Heyst - Noordwal
 Ella van Drumpt - Havincks secretary
 Lieneke le Roux - Bork's secretary
 Lex de Regt - Detective
 Dorijn Curvers - Policewoman
 Han Kerkhoffs - Policeman
 Ger Thijs - Probation officer

References

External links 
 

1987 films
Dutch drama films
1980s Dutch-language films
1987 drama films
Films directed by Frans Weisz